The Fountain of Life, or in its earlier form the Fountain of Living Waters, is a Christian iconography symbol associated with baptism and/or eucharist, first appearing in the 5th century in illuminated manuscripts and later in other art forms such as panel paintings.

Baptismal font
The symbol is usually shown as a fountain enclosed in a hexagonal structure capped by a rounded dome and supported by eight columns. The fountain of living waters, fons vivus is a baptismal font (a water fountain in which one is baptized, and thus reborn with Christ), and is often surrounded by animals associated with Baptism such as the hart.

The best examples date from the Carolingian period: the Godescalc Evangelistary made to commemorate the Baptism of the son of Charlemagne in 781, and in the Soissons Gospels.

Fountain of blood
In the Ghent Altarpiece: The Adoration of the Lamb by Jan van Eyck (1438), the Lamb of God stands upon an altar dressed as for the Mass of the Precious Blood, with a blood-red frontal: the Lamb's blood is caught in a chalice, and its Eucharistic intention is signaled by the dove of the Holy Spirit above. In the foreground, offering the other means of grace, is the Fountain of the Living Water surrounded by the faithful. In the Prado, Madrid, is the Fountain of Living Water emanating from the Lamb of God, in which the open fountain is set into the outer wall of Heaven. That the water is not merely the purifying water of baptism is shown by the innumerable wafers that float upon its surface: the two sacraments are represented as one.

In a miniature in a Book of Hours, probably painted at Ghent at the end of the 15th century, the Fountain of Living Water has given way to a fountain of blood, the Fountain of Life, in which the figure of Christ stands upon a Gothic pedestal at the center and fills the fountain from his wounds, though the aureole that surrounds him identifies him as the transfigured Christ and the location as Paradise.

Blood from the Five Holy Wounds
In Flanders at the close of the Middle Ages an intense devotion to the Precious Blood of Christ gave rise to an iconographic tradition of the 15th and 16th centuries, which rendered the theological concept of Grace, expressing Roman Catholic dogma allegorically as a fountain of blood. This transformation was first addressed in Evelyn Underhill in 1910, taking her point of departure an Assembly of Saints and the Fountain of Life of 1596 in Ghent, in which blood from the five Holy Wounds of Christ flows into the upper basin of a "Fountain of Life" and streams out through openings in the lower "Fountain of Mercy". Saints and martyrs, patriarchs and prophets hold golden chalices of blood, which some empty into the fountain. Below the faithful hold out their hearts to receive droplets of blood.

See also
 The Fountain of Life
 Fountain of Youth
 Odinsaker
 Life-giving Spring, for Byzantine Marian iconography (mediatrix, mother of all graces)
 Church of St. Mary of the Spring (Istanbul), a 6th-century Eastern Orthodox sanctuary in Istanbul
 Zoodochos Pigi (disambiguation)
 Spanish gothic pitoresque treatment Allen Memorial Art Museum, Oberlin College

Notes

References
Leslie Brubaker (1989). "Fountain of Life". Dictionary of the Middle Ages. vol-5. 
Underhill, Evelyn (1910). "The Fountain of Life: An Iconographical Study" The Burlington Magazine 17.86 (May 1910), pp. 99–101 and illus. (available on-line through JSTOR).
Paul Underwood, "The Fountain of Life in Manuscripts of the Gospels", Dubarton Oaks Papers, 5 (1950).

Iconography of illuminated manuscripts
Eucharist in the Catholic Church
Christian iconography
Baptism
Medieval legends